Lasiocampa quercus, the oak eggar, is a common moth of the family Lasiocampidae found in Europe, including Britain and Ireland. It feeds on a variety of plant species (mainly heather and bilberry), and may develop over two years in higher latitudes, where it may be known as the northern eggar. Its specific name quercus refers to the fact that its cocoon generally resembles an acorn, not that its primary food source is oak.

Habitat
The oak eggar's habitat is wide ranging, including scrub, heath, moor, downland, hedges and sea cliffs, reflecting the larva's very varied range of food plants.

Lifecycle

Adult

The moth's wingspan is about 45 mm (male) to 75 mm (female), the female being larger and paler than the male. It is Britain's largest day-flying moth.

The oak eggar is on the wing for about two months between May and September, depending on the latitude. In more northerly latitudes, development can span two years, with larvae over-wintering the first year, and the pupae in the second year. In northern areas it is known as the northern eggar; this was formerly thought to be a separate species, but is generally assumed to be a subspecies Lasiocampa quercus callunae, there is no clear geographical separation of the two types, but the northern eggar tends to be the larger of the two. There are morphological differences and different food preferences. Males tend to be day fliers, while females tend to fly from dusk.

Unpaired females may attract a large number of males, and eggs are laid loosely in undergrowth.

Larva

Larvae feed on a wide variety of plant species, low down, including blackthorn, hawthorn, viburnum, dogwood, ivy and ling, bilberry, broom, larch, birch, willow, hazel, sea buckthorn and Rubus species, including bramble. It is not known to feed on oak; however, one entomologist (Brues, 1924) is quoted as saying: 

Larvae can be infected by a baculovirus, a virus that changes their behaviour, causing them to climb out of the protection of low scrub and leave them open to predation, facilitating the spread of the infection.

The caterpillar hairs of some species of moth, such as the oak processionary moth (Thaumetopoea processionea), can cause skin irritation, but there is no evidence that the oak eggar is one of these, despite the similar name.

Pupa
The caterpillar pupates on the ground inside a silken cocoon, the exterior of which is hard and yellowish, and resembles an acorn, hence the moth's name. Eggar is an obsolete word relating to the shape of the cocoon.

References

External links

Fauna Europaea
Lepiforum.de (in German)
Vlindernet.nl 

Lasiocampidae
Moths described in 1758
Moths of Africa
Moths of Europe
Moths of Asia
Taxa named by Carl Linnaeus